Pointe-aux-Outardes is a village municipality in Quebec, Canada, on the southern point of the Manicouagan Peninsula between the mouths of the Outardes and Manicouagan Rivers.

The place is named after a piece of land that juts out into the Saint Lawrence River and partially encloses the Outardes Bay: Pointe aux Outardes. It literally means "Point of Bustards", but Outarde can also be translated as "Canada goose". In fact, Canada geese and snow geese use the nearby Manicouagan River as a corridor in their annual migration and stopover at the point. The Innu called it Piletipistu Neshkâu, meaning "point of the Partridge River". But the term Outardes was used on Guérard's map of 1631 and on Franquelin's map of 1685 to identify the river that flows past the point into the St. Lawrence.

Pointe-aux-Outardes is exceptionally rich in flora and fauna. Among its salt marshes, more than 175 species of birds have been counted.

Demographics 

Population trend:
 Population in 2011: 1330 (2006 to 2011 population change: -7.8%)
 Population in 2006: 1443
 Population in 2001: 1413
 Population in 1996: 1339
 Population in 1991: 1109

Mother tongue:
 English as first language: 0%
 French as first language: 97.6%
 English and French as first language: 0%
 Other as first language: 2.4%

Photo gallery

References

Incorporated places in Côte-Nord
Villages in Quebec
Canada geography articles needing translation from French Wikipedia